The list of ship launches in 1791 includes a chronological list of some ships launched in 1791.


References

1791
Ship launches